The 1953–54 Swedish Division I season was the tenth season of Swedish Division I. Djurgardens IF defeated Gavle GIK in the league final 1 game to none, 1 tie.

Regular season

Northern Group

Southern Group

Final
Djurgårdens IF – Gävle GIK 5–1, 1–1

External links
 1953–54 season

Swe
Swedish Division I seasons 
1953–54 in Swedish ice hockey